The 49th General Assembly of Nova Scotia represented Nova Scotia between 1967 and September 5, 1970.

Division of seats

There were 46 members of the General Assembly, elected in the 1967 Nova Scotia general election.

List of members

Former members of the 49th General Assembly

References 

Terms of the General Assembly of Nova Scotia
1967 establishments in Nova Scotia
1970 disestablishments in Nova Scotia
20th century in Nova Scotia